Maggie and the Ferocious Beast is a Canadian animated children's television series created by Michael and Betty Paraskevas. The program was based on the 1996 book The Ferocious Beast with the Polka-Dot Hide and its sequels, which were also written by the Paraskevas. The show began as a series of shorts aired on the Canadian channel Teletoon in 1998. In the U.S, the first full-length episode premiered on Nickelodeon's Nick Jr. block on June 5, 2000, and in Canada, the first full-length episode premiered on Teletoon on August 26, 2000. The series ran for three seasons, airing its final episode on June 9, 2002.

Premise
A 5-year-old girl named Maggie creates her own map of an imaginary world known as Nowhere Land that, in reality, takes the characters nowhere. She imagines that the characters Beast and Hamilton Hocks are her best friends.

Episodes

Characters

Main
 Maggie (voiced by Kristen Bone) is a redheaded 5-year-old girl (who later turns 6 years old) and the human protagonist of the show. She is Hamilton's and Beast's best friend. They both look up to Maggie very much and always turn to her for advice. Maggie is the leader of the group and is always there to be the compassionate voice of reason to her dear friends.
 Beast (voiced by Stephen Ouimette) appears ferocious, but is actually gentle and kind. He is a yellow dog-centaur (half-bear, half-pig, half-elephant and half-cow), with big red removable spots, and a human's head with three horns. He often wears multi-coloured galoshes which he pronounces as "Goo-lashes". His favourite phrase is "Great googly moogly!", which he says several times per episode including the opening sequence of the series. In "Hide and Go Beast", it is shown that he is allergic to pollen. Beast loves pretty much any kind of food, especially Hamilton's cooking, and is almost always hungry. He even loves baths. Maggie and Hamilton are his best friends. Hamilton often corrects his pronunciation, but he does not believe him.
 Hamilton Hocks (voiced by Michael Caruana) is a pig who can be bossy and quite fussy, but he does have a warm heart. He lives inside a portable cardboard box which he loves, is the best cook in Nowhere Land, and is a total clean freak. Hamilton's most prized possessions are his beautiful "H" sweater and his cardboard box, which also happens to be his home. Maggie and the Beast are his best friends. In the episode "Hamilton the Ham", he has a great talent for singing. His catchphrase is "Hoo-wee!"

Recurring
 Rudy (voiced by John McGrath) is a cheese-loving mouse who lives in a large wheel of cheese in a part of Nowhere Land called Cheese Town. It is revealed in one episode that Rudy's hat and boots do not come off because they are glued to him. Strangely enough, this character started off with the name Pippy but was renamed by the writers soon after.
 Nedley (voiced by Dwayne Hill) is a white rabbit who speaks in rhymes. He says rhymes almost all through every episode that he appears in, but sometimes he talks normally a little bit before starting his rhyme again. Nedley lives in a rabbit hole next to his carrot patch in Nowhere Land.
 The Moo Sisters (Mavis voiced by Tamara Bernier)  are the three cows who live in a part of Nowhere Land called Mooville. They all love to sing and do it very often. They are sisters and their names are Millicent, Mavis and Marge.
 Mr. Moon is the only non-human and non-animal character in the episode "Blue Moon". He is actually grumpy because people say he is made of green cheese, though it hasn't been proven if he is though.
 The Kindly Giant is not at all scary but instead kind-hearted. The others are scared at first but they soon get used to him and they sometimes go to him for advice or a favour. He refers to Maggie, Hamilton and the Beast as little ones. He owns a garden full of fruits and vegetables, from which he always lets the ever-hungry Beast scarf up a giant blueberry or two. His face is never shown, and he only appears in a few episodes. He is big and strong. Even the Beast seems small compared to the giant. The Kindly Giant lives in an area of Nowhere Land where all the fruits and vegetables are giant-sized. Usually, only his shoes and ankles are seen due to his largeness.
 The Dream Sheep are white sheep that make baa sounds. They are occasionally up in the clouds.
 The Jellybean Team are a group of seven coloured jellybeans. There is a red one, an orange one, a yellow one, a purple one, a black one and two green ones. They are small, of course, but have big personalities. They also tend to argue with each other a lot because they each think they are more important than the others.
 The Triplets (All voiced by Julie Lemieux) are Maggie's baby cousins (Zack, Max, and Oscar). They only appear in four episodes, "One, Two, Three", "Home of the Kindly Giant", "The New Rubber Ball" and "Which Way Did They Go?"
 Big Duck is a large duck with white feathers who lives in the water. She is the focus of the episode "The Big Duck" and appears in the series' theme song.
 Reggie Van Beast (voiced by Dan Chameroy) is Beast's cousin. His colouring is the inverse of Beast's, being red with yellow spots, and he wears a monocle. Unlike Beast, Reggie is rather stuck up and rude, and never really seems to enjoy anything that Beast and his friends want to do. He also often speaks in rhymes, similar to Nedley. He first appeared in "Guess Who's Coming to Visit".

Production
The theme song for the show is "Maggie and the Ferocious Beast in Nowhere Land," which is an original theme music was performed by Isabella Molley. Maggie and the Ferocious Beast is produced by Nelvana and produced with the participation of Teletoon, and directed by Jamie Whitney and Stuart Shankly. The show premiered in 2000 and aired its final episode in 2002. The show is distributed by Nelvana.

Telecast and home media

In Canada, Maggie and the Ferocious Beast aired on Teletoon, Treehouse TV, and Nickelodeon Canada. In the U.S., it aired on Nickelodeon as part of its Nick Jr. block ahead of its Teletoon debut from June 5, 2000, to September 6, 2004. Repeats aired on Noggin, a channel co-founded by Nickelodeon. It also aired on the Nick Jr. channel when it rebranded from Noggin from September 28, 2009, until November 1, 2010, when the show was pulled from its lineup. Qubo picked up the show later on and aired repeats from May 28, 2018, until the channel ceased all operations on February 27, 2021. In the early 2000s, Columbia TriStar Home Entertainment released the show on video and DVD. Also, Phase 4 Films' Kaboom! Entertainment in Canada and Shout! Factory in the U.S. released the show as well, with Vivendi Visual Entertainment handling DVD distribution for the Shout! Factory releases.

Revival
On March 18, 2021, it was announced a revival is now in the works. The computer-animated revival is titled The Ferocious Beast Show and will be produced by US-based Frederator Studios and Nelvana.

References

External links

 

2000 Canadian television series debuts
2002 Canadian television series endings
2000s Canadian animated television series
2000s preschool education television series
Animated preschool education television series
Animated television series about children
Animated television series about ducks
Animated television series about mice and rats
Animated television series about pigs
Animated television series about rabbits and hares
Canadian children's animated comedy television series
Canadian children's animated fantasy television series
Canadian preschool education television series
Canadian television series revived after cancellation
Canadian television shows based on children's books
English-language television shows
Fictional duos
Treehouse TV original programming
Television series about cattle
Television series by Nelvana
Nick Jr. original programming